Jabłonowo Pomorskie (1903-1945: Goßlershausen) is a town in the Brodnica powiat of the Kuyavian-Pomeranian Voivodeship, Poland. As of 2018, the town had a population of 3,783. It is located in the Chełmno Land in the historic region of Pomerania.

History

The oldest known mention of the settlement comes from a document issued by Duke Konrad I of Masovia of the Polish Piast dynasty in 1222.

Following the joint German-Soviet invasion of Poland, which started World War II in September 1939, the town was invaded and then occupied by Germany until 1945. Jabłonowo Pomorskie was one of the sites of executions of Poles carried out by Germany in 1939 as part of the Intelligenzaktion.

Sports
The local football club is Naprzód Jabłonowo. It competes in the lower leagues.

References

External links
 Town website 

Cities and towns in Kuyavian-Pomeranian Voivodeship
Brodnica County